John Anzrah (born 27 October 1954) is a Kenyan sprinter. He competed in the men's 400 metres at the 1984 Summer Olympics.

References

External links
 

1954 births
Living people
Athletes (track and field) at the 1984 Summer Olympics
Kenyan male sprinters
Olympic athletes of Kenya
Place of birth missing (living people)
African Games medalists in athletics (track and field)
African Games silver medalists for Kenya
Athletes (track and field) at the 1987 All-Africa Games
Commonwealth Games bronze medallists for Kenya
Commonwealth Games medallists in athletics
Athletes (track and field) at the 1982 Commonwealth Games
20th-century Kenyan people
Medallists at the 1982 Commonwealth Games